The 1950 Idaho Vandals football team represented the University of Idaho in the 1950 college football season. The Vandals were led by fourth-year head coach Dixie Howell and were members of the Pacific Coast Conference. Home games were played on campus at Neale Stadium in Moscow, with one game in Boise at old Bronco Stadium at Boise Junior College, the season opener at the 

In the rivalry game with Montana at Neale Stadium four weeks earlier, favored Idaho was upset   and relinquished the Little Brown Stein. This was the last Montana win in the series for a decade; Idaho won the next eight, through 

Idaho hosted Oregon for homecoming on October 14 and defeated the Webfoots for the first time in a quarter century. They also hosted  but fell by seven points in a scoreless second half; the Cowboys won all nine games and were ranked twelfth at the end of the regular season, then won the 

The Vandals made distant non-conference road trips to El Paso, Boston, and Tempe. The East Coast trip was a day game win in historic  while the other two in the Southwest were night losses. (Idaho had played at Fenway ten years earlier, with much different

Coaching change
After the season in December, Howell and his staff were given one-year contract  Three months later, in late March 1951, university president Jesse Buchanan requested and received the resignations of Howell and two assistants, due to "lack of harmony" on the coaching staff. One of those assistants was ends coach Babe Curfman, who was then asked by the administration to be the interim coach during the upcoming spring drills. He made a good impression and was re-hired as head coach in

Schedule

All-conference
No Vandals were on the All-Coast team; honorable mention were guard Roy Colquitt and fullback King Block.

NFL Draft
Three seniors from the 1950 Vandals were selected in the 1951 NFL Draft:

One junior was selected in the 1952 NFL Draft:

One sophomore was selected in the 1953 NFL Draft:

List of Idaho Vandals in the NFL Draft

References

External links
Gem of the Mountains: 1951 University of Idaho yearbook – 1950 football season
Go Mighty Vandals – 1950 football season
Official game program: Idaho at Washington State –  October 28, 1950
Idaho Argonaut – student newspaper – 1950 editions

Idaho
Idaho Vandals football seasons
Idaho Vandals football